Jaiprakash Nagar is a metro station on the Orange Line of the Nagpur Metro serving the Jaiprakash Nagar area of Nagpur. It was opened on 20 November 2019.

Station Layout

References

Nagpur Metro stations
Railway stations in India opened in 2019